The Milltown India Rubber Company is a historic building located at 40 Washington Avenue in the borough of Milltown in Middlesex County, New Jersey. Construction of the building started in 1899 and was completed in 1900. Designed by architect George Parsell with vernacular Italianate style, it was part of the rubber industry in the county. The building was added to the National Register of Historic Places on February 13, 1986, for its significance in architecture and industry.

See also
 National Register of Historic Places listings in Middlesex County, New Jersey

References

Milltown, New Jersey
Buildings and structures in Middlesex County, New Jersey
Rubber industry
National Register of Historic Places in Middlesex County, New Jersey
Industrial buildings and structures on the National Register of Historic Places in New Jersey
New Jersey Register of Historic Places
Industrial buildings completed in 1900
1900 establishments in New Jersey